Rubel Ahmed (Born 3 August 2002) is a Bangladeshi cricketer. He made his List A debut for Gazi Group Cricketers in the 2017–18 Dhaka Premier Division Cricket League on 9 February 2018.

References

External links
 

Year of birth missing (living people)
Living people
Bangladeshi cricketers
Gazi Group cricketers
Place of birth missing (living people)